There have been 24 women in the South Australian Legislative Council since its establishment in 1840. Women have had the right to vote and stand as candidates since 1894.

In 1895, South Australian women became the first state in Australia, and some of the first in the world, to be given the right to vote and stand for election to Parliament. The following year at the 1896 election, the first women in Australia voted. Ironically, South Australia was the last state to elect a female representative, at the 1959 election, when Jessie Cooper and Joyce Steele were elected to the Parliament of South Australia for the Liberal and Country League (LCL).

The first woman candidate for Legislative Council honours was Patience Howard, née Hawker (28 March 1900 – 9 August 1994), who stood for the Labor Party for Central No. 2 at the 1953 election. She was unsuccessful in this Liberal stronghold.

The first successful female candidate for the Legislative Council was Cooper. In 1975 she was joined by Labor's first female MLC, Anne Levy, who would later become the first and only female President of the South Australian Legislative Council. Sandra Kanck was the first female Democrat in 1993, and Ann Bressington was the first female independent in 2006.

List of women in the South Australian Legislative Council

Names in bold indicate women who have been appointed as Ministers and Parliamentary Secretaries during their time in Parliament. Names in italics indicate entry into Parliament through a by-election or by appointment and * symbolises members that have sat as members in both the Legislative Council and the Legislative Assembly.

Timeline

References

See also

 
 
South Australia